The H-24-66, or Train Master, was a diesel-electric railroad locomotive produced by Fairbanks-Morse and its licensee, Canadian Locomotive Company. These six-axle hood unit  road switchers were deployed in the United States and Canada during the 1950s. 

They were the successor to the ultimately unsuccessful Consolidated line of cab units produced by F-M and CLC in the 1950s. Each locomotive produced 2,400 horsepower (1.8 MW). In common with other F-M locomotives, the Train Master units employed an opposed piston prime mover. The model rode on a pair of drop equalized three-axle "Trimount" trucks giving it a C-C wheel arrangement.

Overview
Touted by Fairbanks-Morse as "...the most useful locomotive ever built..." upon its introduction in 1953, the 2,400 horsepower (1.8 MW) H-24-66 Train Master was the most powerful single-engine diesel locomotive available at the time, legendary for its pulling power and rapid acceleration. No competitor offered a locomotive with an equal horsepower rating until the ALCO RSD-7 entered production in January 1954 (EMD followed suit later in July 1958 with the SD24, and GE introduced their U25C in September 1963).

While some railroads saw advantages in the Train Master's greater power, the perception on the part of others that the unit had too much horsepower (coupled with the difficulties inherent in maintaining the opposed-piston engine, inadequacies in the electrical system, and a higher-than-normal consumption of cooling water) contributed to poor marketplace acceptance of the Train Masters. Because of this, both F-M and CLC ultimately left the locomotive business with both parties eventually ceasing to exist altogether.

Variations
Three different carbody variants were produced, and were differentiated as follows: Phase 1a units had their air intake louvers located in a continuous line along the top of the long hood, and a wide separating strip between the radiator fans; Phase 1b modifications were minor, consisting only of a "dip" in the long hood handrails that allowed them to better follow the profile of the side walkways; Phase 2 units boasted fewer air intake louvers, with large gaps separating them (the radiators themselves were divided by only a tiny metal strip).

Units manufactured by Fairbanks-Morse (1953–1957)

Units manufactured by the Canadian Locomotive Company (1956)

Preservation
Only one Train Master locomotive has survived intact — former Canadian Pacific Railway (CPR) H-24-66 #8905 is now owned by the Canadian Railroad Historical Association, which operates the Canadian Railway Museum in Saint-Constant, Quebec.

Former Norfolk and Western Railway Train Master slugs survived well into Norfolk Southern service with one currently preserved at the Reading Railroad Heritage Museum in Hamburg, Pennsylvania.

References

Further reading
 
 Ingles, J. David "Train Master Tribute" article pp 28–43 Trains Magazine August 1973.

External links

 Fairbanks-Morse Train Master Sales Booklet: The Lackawanna Story
 Fairbanks-Morse H24-66 Roster
 Preserved Fairbanks Morse Six-Axle Road Switchers
 Canadian Pacific Railway CLC Locomotives
 Train Master slugs

Diesel-electric locomotives of Canada
C-C locomotives
Train Master
CLC locomotives
Diesel-electric locomotives of the United States
Railway locomotives introduced in 1953